Yokosuka naval airfield was an airfield created on Natsu Island (possibly Oppama), near Yokosuka Naval Base, in Tokyo Bay.  It was active in the defense of Tokyo during World War II and was one of the first places occupied by Allied forces after the end of hostilities.

References

External links 
 "Yokosuka, Kanagawa Prefecture, Japan". Pacific Wrecks. Retrieved February 12, 2016.

Airports in Japan
Defunct airports in Japan